Abdel Rahamane Diarra Khalil (born 28 December 1994) is an Ivorian professional footballer who plays for Leixões SC as a centre-back.

Club career
On 21 January 2020, Diarra joined Danish 1st Division club HB Køge on a 2.5-year contract. After terminating his deal with Køge on 30 May 2020 with zero appearances for the club, Diarra returned to Sweden and joined Superettan club AFC Eskilstuna He was released again in July 2021.

International career
Diarra represented Ivory Coast U23s during the 2015 Africa U-23 Cup of Nations qualification matches.

Career statistics

Club

Notes

References

1994 births
Living people
Ivorian footballers
Ivorian expatriate footballers
Association football defenders
TFF First League players
Superettan players
Challenger Pro League players
Academie de Foot Amadou Diallo players
RC Strasbourg Alsace players
Antalyaspor footballers
Karşıyaka S.K. footballers
Syrianska FC players
K Beerschot VA players
HB Køge players
AFC Eskilstuna players
Leixões S.C. players
Ivorian expatriate sportspeople in France
Ivorian expatriate sportspeople in Turkey
Ivorian expatriate sportspeople in Sweden
Ivorian expatriate sportspeople in Belgium
Ivorian expatriate sportspeople in Denmark
Ivorian expatriate sportspeople in Portugal
Expatriate footballers in France
Expatriate footballers in Turkey
Expatriate footballers in Sweden
Expatriate footballers in Belgium
Expatriate men's footballers in Denmark
Expatriate footballers in Portugal
People from Divo, Ivory Coast